Miguel Molina (born July 22, 1984 in Quezon City, National Capital Region) is a swimmer from the Philippines. He is a national record-holder in four individual events (200-meter freestyle, 200-meter breaststroke, the 200- and 400-meter individual medley), and two relay events (the 400-meter medley relay and the 800-meter free relay). He is a much-bemedalled swimmer in SEAG competitions, having won 11 golds, 7 silvers, and 7 bronzes in all.
 
He twice competed in the Asian Games – in Doha in 2006 and Guangzhou in 2010 – but had to settle for fourth in Doha and fifth in Guangzhou in his favorite 400m IM.
 
He also competed in two Olympics, 2004 Athens and 2008 Beijing, but could not advance past the qualifying races.

Personal life

Miguel moved to Tokyo, Japan when he was three years old, and attended St. Mary's International School. It was there in first grade that he first picked up swimming. His parents, Tomas and Mitos Molina, were both runners and basketball players. At St. Mary's, Miguel swam for all 12 years under Coach Dave Moodie.

Moodie later recommended that Molina swim under Nort Thornton at UC Berkeley. From 2002-2005,  he posted a top-six time in six events for Cal.

Molina retired from swimming in 2010, at the age of 26. He was considering transitioning to triathlon in an interview in 2012.

References

1984 births
Filipino male swimmers
Olympic swimmers of the Philippines
Swimmers at the 2004 Summer Olympics
Swimmers at the 2008 Summer Olympics
Living people
Sportspeople from Quezon City
Swimmers at the 2002 Asian Games
Swimmers at the 2006 Asian Games
Swimmers at the 2010 Asian Games
Filipino expatriates in Japan
Male medley swimmers
Southeast Asian Games gold medalists for the Philippines
Southeast Asian Games competitors for the Philippines
Southeast Asian Games medalists in swimming
Competitors at the 2001 Southeast Asian Games
Asian Games competitors for the Philippines
Competitors at the 2003 Southeast Asian Games
Competitors at the 2005 Southeast Asian Games
Competitors at the 2007 Southeast Asian Games
Competitors at the 2009 Southeast Asian Games
Southeast Asian Games silver medalists for the Philippines
Southeast Asian Games bronze medalists for the Philippines
Filipino male freestyle swimmers